Cleeve may refer to the following places in England: 

Cleeve, Somerset, a village in North Somerset
Old Cleeve, a small village between Williton and Dunster in Somerset
Chapel Cleeve, another small village between Williton and Dunster in Somerset
Cleeve Abbey, a ruined Cistercian abbey, just south of Washford in Somerset, now owned by English Heritage
Bishop's Cleeve, a village in Gloucestershire
Cleeve railway station, a former station near Bishop's Cleeve
Cleeve, Oxfordshire, part of Goring-on-Thames

See also
Cleave (disambiguation)
Cleeve Hill (disambiguation)
Cleve (disambiguation)